Verica Šerifović (born 12 September 1963) is a Serbian folk singer. She is the mother and first teacher of Marija Šerifović who was the winner of Eurovision Song Contest 2007.

Verica Šerifović's repertoire consists mostly of folk songs.

Personal life
Verica was born in Kragujevac, her family being Orthodox Christian from the surroundings of Kragujevac. Her first marriage was to Rajko Šerifović, a drummer from Kragujevac of mixed Muslim-Orthodox parentage. Verica had four miscarriages and, with her fifth pregnancy, gave birth to a daughter, Marija, on 14 November 1984. Verica's husband Rajko left her for another woman when she was nine months pregnant with Marija and had a son, Danijel Pavlović, with the other woman in 1985. Marija has described her father as an abusive alcoholic that would regularly beat Verica.

Šerifović's second marriage was to musician Mića Nikolić.

Discography
Možda postoji neko (1988)
Mi smo srećan par (1991)
Ako ima Boga (1993)
Verica Šerifović (1996)
Vol. 7 (1997)
Sa tobom ponovo (1998)
Ciganska snaja (2001)
Veruješ li (2005)
I to će proći (2006)
Ti mi uvek trebaš (2008)

References

External links
 Discography at Discogs

1963 births
Living people
Musicians from Kragujevac
20th-century Serbian women singers
Serbian folk-pop singers
Grand Production artists
Serbian folk singers
21st-century Serbian women singers